Chalciporus radiatus is a bolete fungus of the family Boletaceae. Found in southern China, it was described as new to science in 2015 by Ming Zhang and Tai-Hui Li. The specific epithet radiatus refers to the distinct radial arrangement of the hymenophore.

Description
The pore surface on the cap underside is initially orange to red, later becoming brownish in age. Pores are small, measuring 1–2 mm in diameter. Spores are fusiform (tapered at both ends) to cylindrical with smooth walls, measuring 7–8 by 3.5–4 μm.

Habitat and distribution
Fruit bodies are found singly or scattered under Cunninghamia lanceolata, and species of Cyclobalanopsis and Castanopsis. The type collection was made in Jiulongjiang National Forest Park in Chenzhou, Hunan Province; it has also been collected in Guangdong.

References

External links

Chalciporus
Fungi of China
Fungi described in 2015